Duncan I. Steel is a British space scientist. He has discovered several minor planets and has written four popular science books. He is a member of the International Astronomical Union, which lists him as working at the Xerra Earth Observation Institute in Nelson, in the South Island of New Zealand. He was formerly on the staff of the University of Salford in the United Kingdom.

According to Scopus, Steel has an h-index of 13. Between 1990 and 1994 he discovered twelve numbered minor planets. The asteroid 4713 Steel, discovered by Robert McNaught in 1989, is named after him.

In August 2022 Steel pleaded guilty to burglary and breaching the New Zealand Harmful Digital Communications Act. He was sentenced to 12 months' house arrest and ordered to pay $3000 in reparation for emotional harm.

Books 
 Rogue Asteroids and Doomsday Comets: The Search for the Million Megaton Menace That Threatens Life on Earth (Wiley, New York, 1995) (with a foreword by Arthur C. Clarke).
 Eclipse: The Celestial Phenomenon Which Changed the Course of History (The Joseph Henry Press, Washington D.C., 2001) (with a foreword by Paul Davies). 
 Target Earth (Time Life 2000; Reader's Digest 2001) (with an afterword by Arthur C. Clarke)
 Marking Time: The Epic Quest to Invent the Perfect Calendar (Wiley, New York, 2000).
 Eclipse: The Celestial Phenomenon That Changed the Course of History (National Academies Press, Washington DC, 2001) (with a foreword by Paul Davies).

References 

20th-century British astronomers
21st-century British astronomers
Academics of the University of Salford
Discoverers of asteroids

Living people
Year of birth missing (living people)